Miroslav Polak (born 8 February 1958) is a Serbian football manager and former player.

Born in Belgrade, SR Serbia, then Yugoslav capital, Miroslav "Mirko" Polak initially played in the youth team of FK Čukarički. He then played with Yugoslav giants FK Partizan between 1976 and 1978. Then he moved to FK Rad playing with them in the Yugoslav First and Second leagues until 1986 when he moved abroad to Sweden joining Malmö FF. After one season in Sweden and one in Greece paying with Panionios, he moves to Austria where he plays with SV Salzburg between 1988 and 1990. In 1990, he joins another Austrian side, FC Puch where he becomes player-manager. That was the end of his playing career and the start of a long career as a coach in Austria.

Nowadays he is the Coach of the Bavarian club SB Chiemgau Traunstein, playing in Landesliga Bayern

References

Living people
1958 births
Footballers from Belgrade
Yugoslav footballers
Serbian footballers
Serbian expatriate footballers
Serbian football managers
Association football midfielders
Yugoslav First League players
Super League Greece players
FK Partizan players
FK Rad players
Malmö FF players
Expatriate footballers in Sweden
Panionios F.C. players
Expatriate footballers in Greece
FC Red Bull Salzburg players
Expatriate footballers in Austria
Serbian expatriate football managers
FC Red Bull Salzburg managers
Expatriate football managers in Austria